The 1969–70 Milwaukee Bucks season was the second season for the Milwaukee Bucks. Led by the heralded rookie center Lew Alcindor, they finished with a 56–26 record, enough for second place in the Eastern Division. After beating the Philadelphia 76ers 4–1 in the Eastern semifinals, they lost to the eventual champions New York Knicks in five games.

Draft picks
After a 27–55 record in their inaugural NBA season, the Bucks won a coin toss over the Phoenix Suns to give them the right to select first overall in the 1969 NBA Draft. Their designated selection had long been a foregone conclusion: UCLA Bruins center Lew Alcindor. However, Alcindor was also selected first overall by the New York Nets in the competing American Basketball Association's entry draft, which triggered a bidding war for Alcindor's services. He eventually opted for the Bucks' five-year $1.4 million offer over a much more lucrative $3.2 million offer from the Nets, preferring the established NBA over a new and struggling ABA.

Roster

Regular season

Season standings

Record vs. opponents

Game log

Playoffs

|- align="center" bgcolor="#ccffcc"
| 1
| March 25
| Philadelphia
| W 125–118
| Kareem Abdul-Jabbar (36)
| Kareem Abdul-Jabbar (20)
| Bob Dandridge (6)
| University of Wisconsin Field House9,686
| 1–0
|- align="center" bgcolor="#ffcccc"
| 2
| March 27
| Philadelphia
| L 105–112
| Kareem Abdul-Jabbar (33)
| Bob Dandridge (12)
| Bob Dandridge (7)
| University of Wisconsin Field House9,686
| 1–1
|- align="center" bgcolor="#ccffcc"
| 3
| March 30
| @ Philadelphia
| W 156–120
| Kareem Abdul-Jabbar (33)
| Kareem Abdul-Jabbar (17)
| Flynn Robinson (14)
| Spectrum15,244
| 2–1
|- align="center" bgcolor="#ccffcc"
| 4
| April 1
| @ Philadelphia
| W 118–111
| Kareem Abdul-Jabbar (33)
| Greg Smith (19)
| Bob Dandridge (7)
| Spectrum14,206
| 3–1
|- align="center" bgcolor="#ccffcc"
| 5
| April 3
| Philadelphia
| W 115–106
| Kareem Abdul-Jabbar (46)
| Kareem Abdul-Jabbar (25)
| Bob Dandridge (8)
| University of Wisconsin Field House12,868
| 4–1
|-

|- align="center" bgcolor="#ffcccc"
| 1
| April 11
| @ New York
| L 102–110
| Kareem Abdul-Jabbar (35)
| Kareem Abdul-Jabbar (15)
| Kareem Abdul-Jabbar (5)
| Madison Square Garden19,500
| 0–1
|- align="center" bgcolor="#ffcccc"
| 2
| April 13
| @ New York
| L 111–112
| Kareem Abdul-Jabbar (38)
| Kareem Abdul-Jabbar (23)
| Kareem Abdul-Jabbar (11)
| Madison Square Garden19,500
| 0–2
|- align="center" bgcolor="#ccffcc"
| 3
| April 17
| New York
| W 101–96
| Kareem Abdul-Jabbar (33)
| Kareem Abdul-Jabbar (31)
| Bob Dandridge (8)
| Milwaukee Arena10,746
| 1–2
|- align="center" bgcolor="#ffcccc"
| 4
| April 19
| New York
| L 105–117
| Kareem Abdul-Jabbar (38)
| Abdul-Jabbar, Smith (9)
| Flynn Robinson (7)
| Milwaukee Arena10,746
| 1–3
|- align="center" bgcolor="#ffcccc"
| 5
| April 20
| @ New York
| L 96–132
| Kareem Abdul-Jabbar (27)
| Zaid Abdul-Aziz (12)
| Guy Rodgers (6)
| Madison Square Garden19,500
| 1–4
|-

Player statistics

Season

Playoffs

Awards and honors
 Lew Alcindor, NBA Rookie of the Year
 Lew Alcindor, NBA All-Rookie Team
 Lew Alcindor, NBA All-Star Game Appearance

Notes

References

 Bucks on Database Basketball
 Bucks on Basketball Reference

Milwaukee Bucks seasons
Milwaukee
Milwau
Milwau